The Zaire forest tree frog (Leptopelis fenestratus) is a species of frog in the family Arthroleptidae endemic to the Democratic Republic of the Congo.
Its natural habitats are rivers, freshwater marshes, and intermittent freshwater marshes.

References

Leptopelis
Endemic fauna of the Democratic Republic of the Congo
Amphibians described in 1972
Taxonomy articles created by Polbot